Andrea Collarini was the defending champion but lost in the first round to Marco Cecchinato.

Yannick Hanfmann won the title after defeating Bernabé Zapata Miralles 6–3, 6–3 in the final.

Seeds

Draw

Finals

Top half

Bottom half

References

External links
Main draw
Qualifying draw

Internazionali di Tennis Città di Todi - Singles
2020 Singles